Scott Perlman may refer to:
 Scott Perlman (baseball)
 Scott Perlman (filmmaker)